PHMC may refer to:
Pennsylvania Historical and Museum Commission
Public Health Management Corporation
Petty Harbour-Maddox Cove